Faze-O was a late 1970s funk group based in Dayton, Ohio and produced by Clarence Satchell of the Ohio Players, for whom it was the front band during many live performances.  Their 1977 song "Riding High" has been sampled by hip hop artists.

Band members
Keith Harrison - Arp, Clavinet, Composer, Fender Rhodes, Keyboards, Mini Moog, Percussion, Piano, Piano (Electric), Lead and Backing Vocals
Ralph "Love" Aikens, Jr. - Guitar, Talk Box, Lead and Backing Vocals 	
Tyrone "Flye" Crum - Bass, Backing Vocals
Robert Neal, Jr. - Percussion, Lead and Backing Vocals
Roger Parker - Drums, Percussion

Discography 
 1977 Riding High
 1978 Good Thang
 1979 Breakin' the Funk

References

External links 
 

Funk musical groups from Dayton, Ohio